Aingoth is a settlement in Kerala, India. It is located on the NH17 between Nileshwar and Kanhangad towns on the Cochin-Mangalore National Highway in Kasaragod District, Kanhangad Municipality.

Transportation
The national highway passing through Nileshwaram connects to Mangalore in the north and Calicut in the south. The nearest railway station is Nileshwar on the Mangalore-Palakkad line.

References

Nileshwaram area